Arzah; also spelled Arze or Arzeh; also known as al-Arzah al-Dabaa is a Syrian village located in the Subdistrict of the Hama District in the Hama Governorate. According to the Syria Central Bureau of Statistics (CBS), Arzah had a population of 1,280 in the 2004 census. Its inhabitants are predominantly Alawites.

References

Alawite communities in Syria
Populated places in Hama District